Woranat Thongkruea (born March 28, 1993), simply known as Co, is a Thai professional footballer who plays as a midfielder.

International career

Woranat won the AFF U-19 Youth Championship with Thailand U19, and played in 2012 AFC U-19 Championship.

International goals

Under-19

Honours

Club
Muangthong United
 Thai League 1: 2010
 Kor Royal Cup: 2010

International
Thailand U-19
 AFF U-19 Youth Championship: 2011

External links
 Profile at Goal

Thongkruea, Woranat
Thongkruea, Woranat
Woranat Thongkruea
Woranat Thongkruea
Thongkruea, Woranat
Woranat Thongkruea
Woranat Thongkruea
Woranat Thongkruea
Woranat Thongkruea
Woranat Thongkruea
Woranat Thongkruea